Kenneth Todd (born 24 August 1957) is an English former footballer who scored 11 goals in 52 games in the English Football League for Wolverhampton Wanderers, Port Vale, and Portsmouth in the late 1970s. Despite being bought for £37,000 by Vale and £20,000 by "Pompey", he dropped into the Southern League with Fareham Town and Waterlooville.

Career

Wolverhampton Wanderers
Todd began his career at Sammy Chung's Wolverhampton Wanderers, having been scouted by Joe Mycock, who lived opposite his school in Staindrop. He joined the club as an apprentice on his 15th birthday after a trial in the summer of 1972, despite advances from Middlesbrough and Birmingham City, as he was impressed by the club providing him with tickets for the 1972 UEFA Cup Final against Tottenham Hotspur. He was a member of the 1976 FA Youth Cup side that were beaten 5–0 on aggregate in the final by Black Country derby rivals West Bromwich Albion. He made his debut for the senior team on 6 November 1976, in a 3–1 victory over Millwall at Molineux. He went on to make a further four appearances, scoring one goal against Hereford United, as Wolves won promotion as champions of the Second Division in 1976–77. Wolves then finished 15th in the First Division in 1977–78, and Todd featured in only one game, a home defeat to Nottingham Forest.

Port Vale
Despite his lack of experience, Port Vale manager Dennis Butler broke a club record to purchase him for a £37,000 fee in August 1978. However, he struggled to live up to his price tag and was singled out for abuse at Vale Park. He scored eight goals in 42 Fourth Division and FA Cup games in the 1978–79 season. He lost his first team place under new boss Alan Bloor in August 1979, and played just three games in the 1979–80 season before he was sold on to Portsmouth for £20,000 in October.

Portsmouth and later career
He scored just one goal in three Fourth Division games for Frank Burrows's "Pompey" in the 1979–80 promotion campaign. He left Fratton Park and later played for Fareham Town (Southern League) and Waterlooville. He scored 50 goals in one season for the "Hawks" and later worked as Havant's player-manager. Todd also returned to Portsmouth as the youth-team manager. In a 2014 interview he stated that he was "amazed" when Burrows offered him the position as the pair had fallen out the moment he first arrived at the club.

Personal life
Todd married Suzanne and had a daughter, Ella.

Career statistics
Source:

Honours
Wolverhampton Wanderers
FA Youth Cup runner-up: 1976

References

1957 births
Living people
Footballers from County Durham
English footballers
Association football midfielders
Wolverhampton Wanderers F.C. players
Port Vale F.C. players
Portsmouth F.C. players
Fareham Town F.C. players
Waterlooville F.C. players
Havant Town F.C. players
English Football League players
Southern Football League players
Association football player-managers
English football managers
Portsmouth F.C. non-playing staff